is a sandy beach that occupies much of the northeast coast of the Bōsō Peninsula in Chiba Prefecture, Japan. Kujūkuri Beach is a popular swimming and surfing destination for inhabitants of Greater Tokyo. The beach is protected as part of Kujūkuri Prefectural Natural Park.

Geography
Kujūkuri Beach extends in the shape of an arc from Cape Gyōbumi in Asahi to the north to Cape Taitō in Isumi, Chiba Prefecture to the south. The beach is relatively straight, in contrast to the typically irregular coastlines of Japan. The coastal region of the beach is the north-eastern end of Kuroshio Current influence in Japan. Kujūkuri Beach has no reef.

Municipalities

Kujūkuri Beach extends across ten municipalities in Chiba Prefecture. They include:

Asahi
Sōsa
Yokoshibahikari
Sanmu
Kujūkuri
Ōamishirasato
Shirako
Chōsei
Ichinomiya
Isumi

Etymology 

"Kujūkurihama" literally means "ninety nine ri (sandy) beach." Minamoto no Yoritomo was thought to order the measurement of the beach, and 99 arrows were stuck on the sand—one every ri. The unit "ri" was then 6 chō (approx. 660 m), but later the ri extended to 36 chō (ca. 3.9 km). The short ri of 6 chō has long been forgotten or not in use, thus today many believe and explain incorrectly that 99 is just an inference of its long distance. The actual length of the beach is approximately 66 km, making the original measurement by Minamoto no Yoritomo the correct one.

History

In the Edo period (1603 – 1868) a new fishing net technology was brought from Kii Province, a province that covered present-day Wakayama Prefecture, as well as the southern part of Mie Prefecture. Seine fishing was introduced via trade maritime routes along the Kuroshio Current. Seine fishing, whereby a fishing net hangs vertically in the water with its bottom edge held down by weights, its top edge is buoyed by floats, and is held by fishermen or boats at either end. The introduction of seines allowed for the large-scale fishing of sardines in the region. Kujūkuri Beach became a noted center for the production of hoshika, or dried sardines. After the beginning of the Meiji period in the 19th century motorboats were used to support the net.

In the last days of World War II, the Allied forces planned to land on Kujūkuri Beach in Operation Coronet. Japan's failure to complete the beach's defences on schedule contributed to Emperor Hirohito's decision to surrender.

Flora and fauna
A northern species chum salmon returns to a river of the beach every year, the southernmost in Japan. According to a programme of NHK, Kujūkuri is the best place in Japan to observe the sanderling. These tiny birds can be seen on most spring and autumn days following the ebb and flow of the waves at amazing speeds in search of food.  Kujūkuri Beach is a noted area for sardine fishing. Japanese black pines have been planted along the length of the beach to prevent erosion.

In popular culture
The song Omoide no Kujukurihama (Kujukuri Beach of Memories), by girl group Mi-Ke, peaked at #5 on Oricon and 32 overall on the Japanese record charts in 1991, and was the theme song for the melodrama Nurse Station on TBS.  It has been covered numerous times by other performers.

See also
Shichirigahama - a similarly named beach in Kanagawa Prefecture

References

External links
 99Beach Tourist Guide 

Beaches of Japan
Tourist attractions in Chiba Prefecture
Landforms of Chiba Prefecture